James Armstrong Evans (1827-1887) was a British-born civil engineer who was part of the effort to build the Union Pacific railroad to Promontory Point, Utah in 1869. Evans was present at the Golden spike ceremony on May 10, 1869, connecting the Central Pacific and Union Pacific railroads at Promontory Summit, Utah Territory. Evans was also in the Russell photograph of the same date

Early life and career
Evans was born on February 3, 1827, in Dover, England. His brother John A. Evans, jr. born in 1852 in Pennsylvania, was also a civil engineer.

In 1872, Evans then living in San Diego, California married Jessie Hunt Henriques (1846-1930) in Ann Arbor, Michigan, a descendant of Edward Howell. They had one child, Percy Henriques Evans (1873-1964).

Union Pacific Railroad

Evans was a division engineer and superintendent of construction in the building of the first transcontinental railway, the Union Pacific Railroad (UPRR) for 1863 thru 1869. In the summer of 1863, UPRR president Thomas C. Durant hired Evans along with J.E. House, Samuel B Reed, Percy T Brown and Ogden Edwards for conducting engineering surveys for a possible route to Salt Lake, Utah. Evans was responsible for the Green River to the eastern base of the Black Hills (now known as the Laramie Mountains) segment of the proposed route, a distance of almost 400 miles thru present-day Rawlins, Medicine Bow, Laramie and Cheyenne, Wyoming. The main challenge for Evans was crossing the continental divide between the latter two cities.

In 1867, Evans had a survey party with an engineering assistant named L. L. Hills, working just east of Cheyenne was killed by a band of Arapaho on June 18, 1867. Percy T. Browne ("P. T. Browne") was shot by a band of Sioux warriors and died at LaClede Station also in June 1867.

Evans also worked on the Texas & Pacific Railroad, the Denver, South Park and Pacific Railroad, and other western railroad lines.

Works
 Union Pacific Railroad Company., Evans, J. A., & Durant, T. C. (1865). Report of Jas. A. Evans of exploration from Camp Wallach to Green River. New York: W.C. Bryant & Co., Printers. and map
 Denver South Park and Pacific Railroad: Extension to the Gunnison Valley and anthacite [sic] coal fields of the Elk Mountains. (1880) map 
 Denver, South Park, and Pacific Railroad Company., Evans, J. A., & Evans, J. (1880). Surveys of the line of the company's road (Leadville to Buena Vista in Chaffee and Lake Counties, Colorado). John Evans, President; James. A. Evans, Chief Engineer; March 10, 1880.
 Denver, South Park, and Pacific Railroad., Evans, J. A., & Evans, J. (1882). Summit County branch of the Denver South Park and Pacific Railroad: From sta. 895 on Blue River to the crossing of Grand River. 
 Denver, South Park, and Pacific Railroad map (1883)

Death and interment
Evans died in Denver Colorado on December 26, 1887  and was interred on December 28, 1887, at Riverside Cemetery, also in Denver, Colorado.

Legacy
Several landmarks are named for Evans.
Evans Pass (now known as Sherman, Wyoming)
In 1869, Albert D. Richardson then a correspondent for the New York Tribune wrote that at that time, Evans pass was 
"...the highest railway point in the world -- eight thousand two hundred and forty feet above the sea. Still, it is not the backbone of the Rocky Mountains, but only of the (Laramie mountains), an outlying eastern range. The continental divide is two hundred miles further west and one thousand feet lower. ... Evan's Pass ... bears the name of its discoverer. ... The pass is in no sense a gorge or canyon -- but looks, topographically, like a vast rolling prairie disfigured by rocks and reached by a gentle ascent. Nor are the distant mountains on the north and south such slender peaks and pyramids as fanciful artists depict, but only low, irregular, broken ridges." 
 Evanston, Wyoming
 Evans Avenue, Cheyenne Wyoming

References

Sources
 Athearn, R. G. (1971). Union Pacific country. Lincoln: University of Nebraska Press.
 Dodge, Grenville Mellen. How We Built the Union Pacific Railway: And Other Railway Papers and Addresses. Vol. 447. US Government Printing Office, 1910. List of civil engineers on page 37 of 1910 material. 
 Galloway, John Debo. The First Transcontinental Railroad: Central Pacific, Union Pacific. Simmons-Boardman, 1950. Accessed at  
 Heier, Jan Richard. "Building the Union Pacific Railroad: A study of mid-nineteenth-century railroad construction accounting and reporting practices." Accounting, Business & Financial History 19.3 (2009): 327–351. Accessed at 
 The New York Civil List compiled by Franklin Benjamin Hough (Weed, Parsons and Co., 1858) [pg. 109 and 441 for Senate districts; pg. 132 for senators; pg. 148f for Assembly districts; pg. 221ff for assemblyman] for Hurd's uncle Davis Hurd.
 Klein, Maury. Union Pacific: 1862–1893. Vol. 1. U of Minnesota Press, 2006.

American civil engineers
1827 births
1887 deaths